One Step Forward, Two Steps Back: The Crisis in Our Party is a work written by Vladimir Lenin and published on May 6/19, 1904. In it Lenin defends his role in the 2nd Congress of the Russian Social Democratic Labour Party, held in Brussels and London from July 30 to August 23, 1903. Lenin examines the circumstances that resulted in a split within the party between a Bolshevik ("majority") faction, led by himself, and a Menshevik ("minority") faction, led by Julius Martov.

Synopsis 
Written in 1904 in response to controversies within the Social Democratic Labour Party's Second Congress regarding the status of party membership and organization, Lenin frames this conflicting factionalism within the Party in terms of dialectics. According to Lenin, there are two conflicting factions within the party: "the revolutionaries", which consists of the majority of party members (the Bolsheviks) and "the opportunists", which are the minority (the Mensheviks).

Response 
Rosa Luxemburg, a Marxist living in Germany at the time, responded to the article in Organizational Questions of the Russian Social Democracy (1904). She criticized Lenin's attitude towards democratic centralism and wrote about the role of "spontaneity" among the working class. However, different authors make varying claims about her precise attitude towards Lenin, the Bolshevik faction and the revolutionary situation in Russia.

See also 

 Vladimir Lenin bibliography

References

External links
 One Step Forward, Two Steps Back: The Crisis in Our Party by Vladimir Lenin at the Marxists Internet Archive

1904 non-fiction books
Works by Vladimir Lenin